Rana Chandra Singh (1931 – 1 August 2009), also known as Rana Chandar Singh, was a Pakistani politician and a federal minister. He was one of the founding members of the Pakistan Peoples Party (PPP) and was elected to the National Assembly of Pakistan from Umerkot seven times with PPP between 1977 and 1999. He founded the Pakistan Hindu Party (PHP) in 1990.

Early life
Rana Chandra Singh was born in 1931 in Rana Jagir, 16 km from Umarkot, present day Umerkot District. He belonged to the Sodha clan of Rajputs, and was the Rana (chieftain) of the Amarkot (Umerkot) jagir, a Rajput estate in Pakistan, and Pakistani Hindu Sodha Thakur Rajput.

Career
He was a close friend of Zulfikar Ali Bhutto and Benazir Bhutto, and was a founding member of Pakistan Peoples Party. He was also elected as MPA a number of seven times, serving as Minister of Science and Technology, Revenue and Narcotics Affairs. In 1990 he left PPP and formed his own political party, the Pakistan Hindu Party (PHP). He himself designed for his party a saffron flag bearing two ancient logos – Om and Trishool. He served as Minister for Agriculture and Revenue, and was the Chairman of National Commission of Minorities. He won elections as an Independent candidate for a continuous 53 years – a considerable achievement for a minority Hindu. He had joined PPP after parting way with PML-Q.

He died on 1 August 2009 at the age of 78, after a prolonged illness, as he suffered paralysis in 2004. Prime Minister Syed Yusuf Raza Gilani, in a message to his family, expressed grief over the death of former federal minister, while the President described him as "one of the fearless political activists who joined the party in the early days of its formation by Shaheed Zulfiqar Ali Bhutto and who stood by him through thick and thin". His body was taken to his native village Rana Jagir, 16 km from Umarkot for cremation, where earlier, his elder son Rana Hamir Singh was installed as his successor, the 26th Rana of Tharparkar's Thakurs.

Personal life
He was married to Rani Sahiba Subhadra Kumari, daughter of Rawat Tej Singh of Rawatsar in Hanumangarh district of Rajasthan. They have four sons and one daughter.

References

External links
 Rendezvous with Rana
 Umerkot Fort
 History & GENEALOGY of Umerkot Jagir

1931 births
2009 deaths
Pakistani Hindus
Thari people
Federal ministers of Pakistan
People from Umerkot
Pakistani MNAs 1977
Pakistani MNAs 1985–1988
Pakistani MNAs 1988–1990
Pakistani MNAs 1990–1993
Pakistani MNAs 1993–1996
Pakistani MNAs 1997–1999